Oksanna Pizlova (born 14 November 2000) is an Armenian footballer who plays as a forward for Gyumri and the Armenia women's national team.

International career
Pizlova capped for Armenia at senior level in a 0–1 friendly loss to Lithuania on 4 March 2020.

See also
List of Armenia women's international footballers

References

2000 births
Living people
Women's association football forwards
Armenian women's footballers
Armenia women's international footballers
Armenian people of Russian descent